Ashley Christina Williams (born January 24, 1984) is an American actress. She is known for her roles in the horror films The Human Centipede (First Sequence) (2009) and Julia (2014).

Life and career
Williams was born in Boston, Massachusetts. She graduated from the American Academy of Dramatic Arts in New York City in 2005, where she received the Charles Jehlenger Award for excellence in acting.

She is best known for her role as Lindsay in The Human Centipede (First Sequence), where she plays the middle member of the human centipede.

Her next major role was Piper in the 2010 suspense drama, Empty. In 2014, she had the title role in the horror film Julia, as a rape victim pursuing revenge. She won the award of 'Best Actress' at the 2014 Screamfest Horror Film Festival for her performance as Julia.

Filmography

Film

Television

Theater
Romeo and Juliet (as Juliet) directed by Dario D'Ambrosi at La MaMa Experimental Theatre Club
2010: Bong Bong Bong Against the Walls, Ting Ting Ting in Our Heads (as Loga) at La MaMa Experimental Theatre Club
2010: Spellbound - A Musical Adventure (as Herianne) at New York International Fringe Festival
Under the Veil (as Sammia; a Mind The Art anthology) at La MaMa Experimental Theatre Club
Much Ado About Nothing (as Beatrice) at Milagro Theater (New York City)
The Diary of Anne Frank (as Anne Frank) with Four County Players
The Grapes of Wrath (as Rose of Sharon) at Live Arts

Awards and nominations

References

External links

 
 

1984 births
Living people
American film actresses
American stage actresses
Actresses from Boston
American Academy of Dramatic Arts alumni
21st-century American women